Kirby v Wilkins [1929] Ch 444 is a UK company law and English trusts law case involving the duties owed by a nominee of shares to the beneficiary. It determines that a beneficiary, if absolutely entitled, can instruct a bare nominee how to deal with the shares. Pending any instructions about voting from the beneficial owner, the registered holder can vote shares in the beneficiary's interest.

Facts
Mr Kirby was one of four people which sold a business to Derby Paper Staining Ltd. Unfortunately, the price was miscalculated and the company overpaid. It had paid by giving £16,000 worth of its shares to the four. The four decided, voluntarily and not because of any right of the company arising from misrepresentations, to give the company back £3,000 worth of shares. But then Mr Kirby argued, against the chairman, Mr Wilkins, that the shares were held on trust for the individual shareholders, and so he could not vote at any meeting on the shares. Mr Wilkins argued that the shares would be held on trust for the company.

Judgment
Romer J first decided that the transfer did not violate the principle of a company purchasing its own shares. In the course of his judgment he said the following.

See also
Vandervell v IRC [1967] 2 AC 291, beneficial owner directs the dealings by a registered owner to transfer shares
Butt v Kelson [1952] Ch 197 
Nestle v National Westminster Bank plc [1994] 1 All ER 118, 135, trustees manage impartially, with independent judgment for all beneficiaries’ benefit

Notes

References
RC Nolan, 'Indirect Investors: A Greater Say in the Company?' [2003] JCLS 73
RC Nolan, ‘Vandervell v IRC: A Case of Overreaching’ [2002] CLJ 169, argued that a trustee should not have to take instructions from a beneficiary with a limited interest in shares, because that would be contrary to the principle that a registered owner should vote in the interests of all beneficiaries.

United Kingdom company case law
English trusts case law
1929 in case law
1929 in British law
High Court of Justice cases